Piero Dotti (born 16 May 1939 in Castelfranco Emilia, Province of Modena) is a retired Italian professional football player.

1939 births
Living people
People from Castelfranco Emilia
Italian footballers
Serie A players
A.C.R. Messina players
S.S. Lazio players
Inter Milan players
Atalanta B.C. players
Aurora Pro Patria 1919 players
Venezia F.C. players
Association football defenders
Footballers from Emilia-Romagna
Sportspeople from the Province of Modena